John Stewart Wyllie, also known as Jock Wyllie (1884 – 1940) was a Scottish professional footballer who played as a centre half.

Career
Born in Riccarton, Wyllie spent his early career with Kilmarnock Deanpark, Kilmarnock, Rangers, Maxwelltown Volunteers, Ayr Parkhouse, Ayr, Hurlford, Clyde and Aberdeen. He signed for Bradford City from Aberdeen in May 1912. He made 24 league appearances for the club, before returning to Aberdeen in September 1913. He later played for Fraserburgh, St Johnstone and Forfar Athletic, and later coached in Norway.

Sources

References

1884 births
1940 deaths
Date of birth uncertain
Date of death missing
Scottish footballers
Kilmarnock F.C. players
Footballers from Kilmarnock
Rangers F.C. players
Ayr Parkhouse F.C. players
Ayr F.C. players
Hurlford United F.C. players
Clyde F.C. players
Aberdeen F.C. players
Bradford City A.F.C. players
Fraserburgh F.C. players
St Johnstone F.C. players
Forfar Athletic F.C. players
Highland Football League players
Scottish Football League players
English Football League players
Association football defenders